Josh Graves (September 27, 1927 Tellico Plains, Monroe County, Tennessee  – September 30, 2006), born Burkett Howard Graves, was an American bluegrass musician. Also known by the nicknames "Buck," and "Uncle Josh," he is credited with introducing the resonator guitar (commonly known under the trade name of Dobro) into bluegrass music shortly after joining Lester Flatt, Earl Scruggs and the Foggy Mountain Boys in 1955. He was inducted into the International Bluegrass Music Hall of Honor in 1997.

He joined producers Randall Franks and Alan Autry for the In the Heat of the Night cast CD “Christmas Time’s A Comin’” performing "Christmas Time's A Comin'" with the cast on the CD released on Sonlite and MGM/UA for one of the most popular Christmas releases of 1991 and 1992 with Southern retailers.

Career 
 1942 Joined the Pierce Brothers playing in Gatlinburg
 Played with Esco Hankins and Mac Wiseman
 Joined Wheeling, West Virginia's WWVA Jamboree with Wilma Lee and Stoney Cooper
 1955-1969 Lester Flatt, Earl Scruggs and the Foggy Mountain Boys
 1969-1971 Lester Flatt's Nashville Grass.
 1971-1974 Earl Scruggs Revue.
 1974 started solo career.
 1984-2006 performed and recorded with Kenny Baker and also with the Masters including Baker, Jesse McReynolds and Eddie Adcock.

Musical style 
Graves originally joined the Foggy Mountain Boys as a bass player but collaborated with bandmate Earl Scruggs to develop a new style of dobro-picking based on Scruggs' three-finger syncopated banjo style. Graves switched to the dobro; his way of playing helped propel the instrument into becoming one of the defining features of the bluegrass sound. Graves adoption of hammer-ons and pull-offs to combine open strings and fretted notes in rapid scalar passages elevated the Dobro to the level of holding its own with the fiddle and banjo. Graves played fast and loud but also created extremely sensitive melodic backing to bluesy ballads and slower gospel numbers. Josh Graves is credited as being a major influence on many leading resophonic guitar players, including Jerry Douglas, Mike Auldridge, and Phil Leadbetter among them.

References

Discography of Blue Grass Sound Recordings, 1942-, Ibiblio catalog, accessed October 22, 2020, https://www.ibiblio.org/catalog/items/show/3583.

Goldsmith, Thomas. The Bluegrass Reader. 2006. Chicago: University of Illinois Press.

Graves, J., Bartenstein, F., & Rosenberg, N. (2012). Bluegrass Bluesman: A Memoir (Music in American Life) (1st ed.). University of Illinois Press.

Rosenberg, Neil V. Bluegrass: A History. 2005. Chicago: University of Illinois Press.

External links 
 OMS Records - Josh Graves 
 Brad's Page of Steel

Selected Discography

Albums

1927 births
2006 deaths
People from Tellico Plains, Tennessee
Bluegrass musicians from Tennessee
Slide guitarists
20th-century American guitarists
Guitarists from Tennessee
Country musicians from Tennessee
Nashville Grass members
Foggy Mountain Boys members